Karl Uchermann (31 January 1855 – 15 October 1940) was a Norwegian painter and illustrator. He is best known for his portraits of animals, in particular dogs. He also painted altarpieces, and is credited for designing the world's first franking machine in 1901.

Personal life
Uchermann was born in Borge, Nordland, to parish priest Arnt Uchermann and Anna Stang, and married Bolette Hermana Schnitler in 1892. He was a nephew of prime minister of Norway Frederik Stang, a cousin of prime minister Emil Stang and physician Vilhelm Uchermann, a son-in-law of war historian Didrik Thomas Johannes Schnitler, and brother-in-law of war historian Gudmund Schnitler. He died in Oslo in 1940.

Career

Uchermann studied at the Norwegian National Academy of Craft and Art Industry from 1872 to 1875, with Anders Askevold in Bergen from 1875 to 1876, at the Academy of Fine Arts in Munich from 1876 to 1878, and with Émile van Marcke in Paris from 1878 to 1881.

Uchermann is known for his paintings of animals, in particular dogs. Among his paintings are Flamsk hundeforspann from 1880, Fienden kommer from 1895, and I solveggen from 1899, all located at the National Gallery of Norway. Hvile paa Jagten from 1880 is located at the Musée des Beaux-Arts de Bordeaux. Julenek med fugler from 1882 is located at the Royal Palace, Oslo. He also painted altarpieces, and illustrated children's books and magazines.

He designed the world's first practical franking machine in 1901, which was further developed and manufactured in cooperation with Nils Krag.

He was awarded the King's Medal of Merit in gold in 1935.

Selected books with illustrations by Uchermann
Vers og Billeder (1885, jointly with F. Gjertsen)
Norsk Lyrik efter 1814 (1891)
Nordahl Rolfsen: Læsebog for folkeskolen (1892–1895)
K. Gløersen: Fra jagten og naturen (1892)
Carl Willoch Ludvig Horn: Lærebog i geografi for middelskolen (1893)
O. D. Adeler: Den norske Robinson (1894)
Theodor Caspari: Norsk Høifjeld (1898)
Thorleif Schjelderup-Ebbe: Dyreliv. Digte for barn (1915)

Gallery

References

External links

1855 births
1940 deaths
People from Vestvågøy
19th-century Norwegian painters
20th-century Norwegian painters
Norwegian male painters
Norwegian illustrators
Oslo National Academy of the Arts alumni
Academy of Fine Arts, Munich alumni
Norwegian expatriates in Germany
Norwegian expatriates in France
Recipients of the King's Medal of Merit in gold
Norwegian inventors
19th-century Norwegian male artists
20th-century Norwegian male artists